Newsday is an American newspaper in Long Island. Also distributed in the New York City metropolitan area.

Newsday may also refer to:

Newspapers
 New York Newsday, Times Mirror Company New York City newspaper (1985-1995)
 Newsday (Melbourne), an Australian afternoon daily newspaper (1969-1970)
 NewsDay (Zimbabwean newspaper), a Zimbabwean newspaper
Trinidad and Tobago Newsday, a Trinidadian daily newspaper, with a separate daily edition for Tobago known as Tobago Newsday

Radio and television
 Newsday (9News), a former newscast on 9TV, now CNN Philippines
 Newsday (radio programme), a radio programme on BBC World Service
 Newsday (TV programme), a newscast on BBC World News
 PVO NewsDay, an Australian television programme